Life-Size 2, also known as Life-Size 2: A Christmas Eve, is a 2018 American fantasy-comedy television film directed by Steven Tsuchida and starring Tyra Banks and Francia Raisa. It is the sequel to Life-Size starring Banks and Lindsay Lohan, which originally premiered in 2000 on ABC as part of The Wonderful World of Disney.

The sequel was produced by Tyra Banks, Stephanie Allain, Roger M. Bobb, and Angi Bones. It premiered during Freeform's 25 Days of Christmas, on December 2, 2018.

In February 2020, Banks revealed she was working on Life-Size 3.

Plot 
Grace, the young CEO of Marathon Toys, is in the middle of a quarter-life crisis as she struggles with her job. With the help of her young neighbor, Grace's old Eve doll magically awakens to help get Grace back on track.

Cast

Production

Development 
In November 2012, it was announced that Disney Channel was developing a sequel to Life-Size. In September 2015, Tyra Banks told Hollywood Life that a script was being worked on, and hoped to have the film released around Christmas of 2016. In April 2017, it was announced that the sequel had been greenlit, for a planned debut on Freeform in December 2018.

Casting 
In July 2018, it was revealed that Francia Raisa had been cast as Banks's costar, with Gavin Stenhouse, Shanica Knowles, Hank Chen, and Alison Fernandez rounding out the cast. Lindsay Lohan, who starred in the original Life-Size, was not available to film scenes because of Lohan's prior commitments to her new MTV reality show, Lindsay Lohan's Beach Club. Banks, when asked if Lohan would have any screen time in the sequel, revealed, "There's something beautiful we do with Lindsay in this movie that'll speak to die-hard fans."

Filming 
The movie was entirely filmed in Atlanta, Georgia.

Reception 
Life-Size 2 drew 1.26 million viewers, with a 0.66 rating in adults 18–34.

References

External links
 

2010s American films
2018 television films
2010s fantasy comedy films
American Christmas films
American fantasy comedy films
2010s English-language films
Christmas television films
Films scored by Germaine Franco
Films set in Atlanta
Films shot in Atlanta
Films about size change
Films about dolls
Films about sentient toys
Television sequel films
2018 films
2018 comedy films
Films directed by Steven Tsuchida